Roberto Carlos Chale Olarte, "Roberto Chale" (born 24 November 1946) is a Peruvian former football player, recognized as one of Peru's most important midfielders. He was born in Lima.

He is also known as Maestro (Master) or Niño Terrible (Enfant terrible), Chale is best remembered for his performance in the 1970 World Cup qualifying match against Argentina on 30 August 1969, which sent Peru to the finals.

He earned 48 caps and scored 4 goals for the Peru national football team, and played in the 1970 FIFA World Cup, where he scored 1 goal and Peru reached the quarterfinals.

Playing career

His debut in the Peruvian First Division was in 1965 at Centro Iqueño. He later played for Universitario de Deportes where he became four times Peruvian champion in 1966, 1967, 1969 and 1971, Defensor Lima with whom he won the league one more time in 1973, Sport Boys and Sporting Cristal.

He also played for Universidad Católica of Ecuador before his retirement with Universitario in 1980.

Honours as a player

Participation in the World Cup

Coaching career

As a manager Chale coached Juan Aurich, CNI, Atlético Chalaco and Deportivo Wanka during the early 1980s.

Chale enjoyed a stint as coach of Peru during the qualifiers for the 1986 World Cup, keeping Peruvian hopes alive until the last game against future World Cup winners Argentina in Buenos Aires ended in a 2–2 draw.

Later on he managed San Agustín, Defensor Lima, Sport Boys, Deportivo Municipal, Deportivo Pesquero, Coopsol, Universitario, with whom he won the Peruvian leagues of 1999 and 2000, as well as Alianza Lima.

Titles as a manager

External links

World Great Star of the World Cup: Roberto Chale
FIFA Statistics

1946 births
Living people
Peruvian footballers
Peru international footballers
1970 FIFA World Cup players
Club Universitario de Deportes footballers
Sporting Cristal footballers
Deportivo Municipal footballers
C.D. Universidad Católica del Ecuador footballers
Expatriate footballers in Ecuador
Peruvian football managers
Sport Boys managers
Club Universitario de Deportes managers
Peru national football team managers
Peruvian expatriate footballers
Centro Iqueño footballers
Association football midfielders